The Bulgarian Virtual University (BVU) is a partnership of Bulgarian universities collaborating in the development of distance and online education.

History
The Bulgarian Virtual University (BVU) was established at the end of 2004. The initiative came from the Chairmen of the Council of Rectors of the Bulgarian Academy of Sciences, the Higher Certifying Committee, the Union of Teachers, the Federation of the Unions of Scientists, the Bulgarian Association of Information Technologies and other educational, research and business organisations. The agreement to set the BVU up was signed by the Rectors of 37 Universities and the Directors of 27 Institutes of the Bulgarian Academy of Sciences.

Mission
The idea of the initiators and founders was that the Bulgarian Virtual University would initially be a national educational portal to all universities in the country (similar to the Canadian Virtual University) and its independent functions and importance would gradually increase. As Professor Y. Kouzmanova, PhD, Chairman of the Council of Rectors, stated in her welcoming speech, This is the first realistic step towards the integration of the universities in Bulgaria.

BVU has not been established with the aim of becoming a governing body, thus restricting and taking over some of the functions of the regional universities. The goal of BVU is not to teach students and confer qualifications at the moment because in Bulgaria there is no still legislation for virtual education.. 

The goal of BVU and the programme as a whole is to provide all-round technical and methodological support to the regional universities in their transition to electronic education, namely in setting up computer rooms and adopting software platforms for electronic education, as well as in developing web-based courses and virtual laboratories, creating virtual libraries, centres for distance learning, virtual universities and campuses. 

Another equally important goal of BVU is to promote the integration of the Bulgarian with the European and world virtual educational space.

Success
At the end of 2008 four years will have passed since the establishment of the Bulgarian Virtual University. 
Besides serving successfully as a portal to the regional universities, this site allows an interested person to start his search from a specific area of higher education, and going through the professional field, to find a relevant degree programme, and, eventually, the sites of the universities offering Bachelor courses in this programme. The BVU site is also the centre of the national network of virtual libraries in Bulgaria.

References

External links

Educational organizations based in Bulgaria